"Do My Dance" is produced by David D.A. Doman for American rapper Tyga featuring 2 Chainz. The song was first released on October 2, 2012, as the lead single from the rapper's mixtape, Well Done 3 (2012). The song features undredited vocals from American singer Cassie.

Track listing

Music video
The video was released at Vevo on October 2, 2012. As of January 2018, the video has over 35 million views on YouTube. Swizz Beatz makes a cameo appearance in the video.

Charts

Certifications

Release history

References

External links
 

2012 singles
2012 songs
Tyga songs
2 Chainz songs
Cash Money Records singles
Republic Records singles
Songs written by 2 Chainz
Songs written by Tyga
Music videos directed by Colin Tilley
Songs written by D.A. Got That Dope